Echinolampadidae is a family of cassiduloid echinoids.

Cassiduloida
Echinoderm families